Philip Baker (1880 – c. May 1932) was an Irish chess player.  He won the Irish Chess Championship in 1924, 1927, 1928, and 1929.

Baker was born in Riga, Latvia then part of Imperial Russia in 1880, he was a Jew. A draper and cap maker by profession, he lived in Tralee, Co. Kerry before moving to Dublin.

He was Leinster champion in 1922 and 1926. In 1924 Baker finished first in the Tailteann Games. With the Sackville Chess Club Baker won the Armstrong Cup in 1926 and 1929.

He died in Rathmines, Dublin in May 1932.

References

Further reading

 British Chess Magazine, 1932, p. 545

Year of birth unknown
1932 deaths
Irish chess players
Irish Jews
1880 births
Emigrants from the Russian Empire to the United Kingdom